The 2016–2017 English Hockey League season took place from September 2016 until April 2017. The regular season consisted of two periods September until December and then February until March. The end of season playoffs known as the League Finals Weekend was held on 22 & 23 April.

Surbiton won the Men's Premier League title despite being 3-0 down in the final against Wimbledon with only 10mins to go. Surbiton also won the Investec Women's Premier League as well as finishing top of the regular season league standings, making it their 4th in a row. Whilst Canterbury finished one off the bottom and survived the relegation playoffs for the 3rd time in a row as Loughborough Students were relegated having just got up into the top flight last season. Sevenoaks beat Team Bath Buccaneers and Durham University to secure promotion and go up to the top flight next season in the men's competition. In the women's Reading got relegated and Buckingham beat Wimbledon and Brooklands Poynton to secure promotion, as Bowdon Hightown won the group to keep their place in the Premier League.

The Men's Cup was won by Reading with the biggest score difference in 15 years against Canterbury in the final. The Investec Women's Cup was won by Surbiton.

Men's Premier Division League Standings

Results

Women's Investec Premier Division League Standings

Results

League Finals Weekend

Semi-finals

3rd/4th Playoff
 Due to Wimbledon's finishing fourth in the 2016–17 Euro Hockey League a third team from England is allowed to join the competition meaning a 3rd/4th playoff is necessary.

Finals

Men's Cup

Quarter-finals

Semi-finals

Final
(Held at the Lee Valley Hockey & Tennis Centre on 29 April)

Women's Cup

Final

Promotion Tournaments
The winners of the 3 regional conferences and the second to bottom placed team in Premier League play a Promotion Tournament with the top 2 placed teams playing in the Premier League next season while the bottom 2 play in the conference leagues.

Men's competition

Women's competition

References

England Hockey League seasons
field hockey
field hockey
England